Stephen S. Grabowski (born April 1, 1952) is a former Democratic member of the Pennsylvania House of Representatives.

References

Democratic Party members of the Pennsylvania House of Representatives
Pittsburgh City Council members
Living people
1952 births